The Motunau River is a river of the north Canterbury region of New Zealand's South Island. It flows south-east from coastal hills south-west of Cheviot, reaching the Pacific Ocean at Motunau Beach at the northern tip of Pegasus Bay.

See also
List of rivers of New Zealand

References

Rivers of Canterbury, New Zealand
Rivers of New Zealand